Astrid Linder is a Swedish engineer and researcher in motor vehicle safety. For her contribution to the field, Linder was awarded EU Champions of Transport Research Competition and U.S. Government Award for Safety Engineering Excellence.

Career 
Linder completed a PhD in mechanical engineering in the field of traffic safety in 2002. She has worked on the safety of both men and women during car accidents, but her pioneering work focuses on addressing the safety of women in road accidents, who are twice as much at risk compared to men drivers. Linder champions equal safety assessment for men and women, as the crash dummy often used by the industry (based on male morphology) does not account for weight distribution and dynamic responses of females. As a solution, Linder, along with her colleagues, developed EvaRID – an anthropometrically appropriate female crash dummy for safety assessment of women in vehicles. EvaRID has potential to be an instrumental tool in evaluating the safety of female drivers in cars.

Her expertise includes biomechanics, occupant kinematics, vehicle crash injury prevention, mathematical simulations and dynamic testing. She currently holds the position of research director at Swedish National Road and Transport Research Institute and adjunct professor at Chalmers University of Technology.

References

Year of birth missing (living people)
Living people
21st-century Swedish engineers
Swedish women engineers
Swedish mechanical engineers
21st-century women engineers